2011 Academy Awards may refer to:

 83rd Academy Awards, the Academy Awards ceremony which took place in 2011 honouring the best in film for 2010
 84th Academy Awards, the Academy Awards ceremony which took place in 2012 honouring the best in film for 2011